Megan Ki'llani Faraimo (born July 14, 2000) is an American college softball pitcher for the UCLA Bruins. As a sophomore in 2020, she was named Softball America Pitcher of the Year.

High school career
Faraimo attended Cathedral Catholic High School in San Diego, California where she was a two-sport star, playing volleyball for three years, and softball for four years. As a junior in 2017, she went 27–1 with a 0.60 earned run average (ERA) and 251 strikeouts in  innings to help lead CCHS to a CIF-SDS Open Division title, as well as a Western League championship. Following the season she was named CIF-SDS Pitcher of the Year and Western League Most Valuable Player.

As a senior in 2018, she went 26–3 in 2018, with a 0.23 ERA and 405 strikeouts in  innings and allowed just 47 hits and eight walks. She had 17 shutout and five no-hitters, including four perfect games. Her 405 strikeouts were the second-highest single-season total in CIF-SDS history. Following an outstanding season, she was named Gatorade National Softball Player of the Year, and San Diego Union-Tribune Pitcher of the Year. She was the No. 1 recruit in the class of 2018 according to FloSoftball and Extra Inning Softball. She finished her career with 1,029 strikeouts, and with the school's all-time record for most wins (78), shutouts (45) and perfect games (five).

College career
Faraimo began her collegiate career for the UCLA Bruins in 2019. During her freshman year she appeared in 27 games, with 21 starts, and posted a 16–4 record with a 1.41 ERA and 143 strikeouts in 114 innings. She threw 11 complete games, six solo shutouts, and two no-hitters, while holding opponents to a .166 batting average. She was a five-time Pac-12 Freshman of the Week honoree. She ranked third among Pac-12 pitchers in ERA and opponents batting average, tied for seventh in wins and eighth in strikeouts. Following an outstanding season, she was named Pac-12 Conference Freshman of the Year, All-Pac-12 First Team, Pac-12 All-Freshman Team, and was a top-ten finalist for the NFCA National Freshman of the Year.

During her sophomore year in 2020, she led the Bruins with a 13–1 record, a 0.85 ERA and 149 strikeouts in  innings. She pitched complete games in all 10 of her starts, including five shutouts and limited opponents to a .153 batting average. She ended the season with a streak of  consecutive scoreless innings, before the season was cancelled due to the COVID-19 pandemic. She ranked first among all pitchers in the nation in strikeout-to-walk ratio (29.80), second in strikeouts, tied for second in wins, fourth in walks allowed per seven innings (0.39), and tied for sixth in shutouts. She ranked first among Pac-12 pitchers in ERA, opposing batting average, strikeouts and wins and second in innings pitched. Following the season she was named Softball America Pitcher of the Year.

During her redshirt sophomore year in 2021, she appeared in 28 games, with 19 starts, and posted a 19–3 record, a 1.10 ERA and 184 strikeouts in  innings. On February 24, 2021, she pitched the 19th perfect game in UCLA program history. She recorded five strikeouts, and threw just 64 pitches with a 67.2 strike percentage, in a 14–0 victory against San Diego State. On April 17, 2021, she recorded a career-high 17 strikeouts in a one-hit shutout against Oklahoma State. She finished the season with 13 complete games, including eight shutouts and limited opponents to a .142 batting average. She allowed zero or one earned run in 22 of her 28 appearances. She ranked first among Pac-12 pitchers in opposing batting average, second in ERA, fourth in strikeouts and tied for fourth in wins, and led the nation in strikeout-to-walk ratio (14.15). Following the season she was named a finalist for USA Softball Collegiate Player of the Year, All-Pac-12 First Team, and NFCA First-Team All-American.

During her redshirt-junior year in 2022, she posted a 22–4 record, with seven saves, a 1.78 ERA, and 244 strikeouts in  innings. She led the Pac-12 in strikeouts (244), batters struck out while looking (59), saves (6) and appearances (35). She ranks second in program history in solo perfect games (3) and holds the single-season saves record (7). Following an outstanding season, she was named the Pac-12 Conference Pitcher of the Year and a second-team All-American. She became the second player in conference history to win both Pac-12 Freshman of the Year and Pitcher of the Year in a career, after Rachel Garcia.

International career
Faraimo represented the United States at the 2019 U-19 Women's Softball World Cup. She finished the tournament with three wins and allowing no walks, one earned run, eight hits and 43 strikeouts in  innings, with a 0.32 ERA. She opened the tournament with a four-inning perfect game on August 10, 2019, against Mexico, striking out all 12 batters she faced. Three days later against Canada, she was a part of a combined perfect game, striking out eight in three innings. She pitched a complete game on August 15 against Japan, striking out 14 in the victory and giving up just three hits. In the gold medal game against Japan on August 17, she struck out nine in  innings, allowing one earned run and five hits, to help USA win gold.

Personal life
Faraimo was born to Marcie and Bill Faraimo. She has a sister, Muta, and two brothers, Matthew and Madden. Matthew was a member of USC Trojans men's volleyball team from 2017 to 2020. She is of Samoan descent.

References

Living people
2000 births
American people of Samoan descent
Sportspeople from San Diego
Softball players from California
UCLA Bruins softball players
Competitors at the 2022 World Games
World Games gold medalists
World Games medalists in softball